Yael Kanarek (born 1967) is an Israeli American artist based in New York City that is known for pioneering use of the Internet and of multilingualism in work of art.

Background
Born in New York and raised in Israel, Kanarek returned to New York in 1991 for art school and began exhibiting in galleries. Kanarek was a leading figure in the early days of the internet art scene in New York and collaborated for over ten years with Eyebeam, where she founded and led the Upgrade!, an international network of artists and curators concerned with art, technology and activism.

Kanarek has been developing an integrated media project called World of Awe since 1995. At the core of World of Awe is "The Traveler's Journal"—an original narrative that uses the ancient genre of the traveler's tale to explore connections between storytelling, travel, memory and technology. Her pioneering online art practice was featured in 2002 Whitney Biennial, which included a World of Awe portal and a series of related drawings. In that same year, she was also commissioned by the SF MoMA and Turbulence.org to continue its development online.

Career
Since 2003, her practice has been focused on multilingualism, and her observation of how language online acts as a border and a space. The Textwork series started in 2007 with Hebrew, Arabic and English. It has since grown more complex and has incorporated additional languages. In 2010, she began a series of screen-based computational video clocks. These works are audiovisual collages that runs on custom software designed by her and Shawn Lawson.

As an Israeli-American artist, one of her works involved rewriting the entire Torah- both in Hebrew and English- by changing the gender of all the characters within it. She called it the Toratah, which shed light on the patriarchal social structures we live in. Along with that, it codified women's experiences and inspired to descend through mother/daughter lineages, within the traditional language of the Hebrew Bible.

Kanarek's art has been primarily exhibited in the US and Europe. Solo exhibitions of her work have been presented at Jewish Museum (Manhattan), Nelly Aman Gallery in Tel Aviv, bitforms gallery in New York, Sala Uno Gallery in Rome, the Moving Image Gallery in New York, and Space Time Light Gallery in New York. Kanarek's work has also been featured by The Drawing Center, The Kitchen, American Museum of the Moving Image, Whitney Museum of American Art; Iris & B. Gerald Cantor Center for Visual Arts, National Museum of Contemporary Art in Athens, Beral Madra Contemporary Art in Istanbul, Rhizome (organization), Exit Art, A.I.R. Gallery, Holster Projects in London, LIMN Gallery in San Francisco, Wood Street Galleries in Pittsburgh, CU Museum in Boulder, Arena 1 in Santa Monica, SIGGRAPH; California College of the Arts, Ronald Feldman Gallery in New York, Derek Eller Gallery in New York, 303 Gallery in New York, Schroeder Romero Gallery in New York, among many others. 

She has been a founder of the company KANAREK since 2013, a fine jewelry company that specializes in text jewelry. They use custom text created by her and work closely with the clients to create these fine jewelry. In 2017, Kanarek was awarded a commission by the US State Department's Art in Embassies program to create a large-scale sculpture for the new consulate in Harare, Zimbabwe. DAY/NIGHT a site specific sculpture in Harare. It is a cluster of words of 76 units for the word Day/Night written in 19 languages spoken in Zimbabwe.

19 Languages
Barwe: Masikati - Usiku
Chewa: Masana - Usiku
Doma: Masikati - Usiku
English: Day - Night
Hwesa: Masikati - Usiku
Jahunda: Masikati - Mahwela
Kalanga: Masikati - Busiku
Khoisan: Dzini - Hae
Kunda: Masikati - Usiku
Nambya: Muzhuba - Busiku
Ndau: Masikati - Usiku
Ndebele: Emini - Ebusuku
Shona: Masikati - Usiku
Sotho: Motsehare - Bosiu
Tonga: Sikati - Mansiku
Tsonga/Shangani: Siku - Vusiku
Tswana: Motshegare - Bosigo
Venda: Masiari - Vhusiku
Xhosa: Imini - Ubusuku

Textwork series 
The Textwork series started in Hebrew, Arabic, and English. This project centers around the fundamental hypothesis that language and numerals render reality that is an entirely subjective singular field. The series started in 2007 and grown increasingly complex and has since developed to include additional languages. Kanarek's Textwork Series may seem to be analog on the surface, but Kanarek utilizes some creative new media techniques to weave the works through the digital realm. In an interview with Daily Serving she discusses her work and the Textwork series.

World of Awe Series 
World of Awe is a cross-disciplinary project centering around The Traveler's Journal, an original narrative started in 1994 and completed in 2011. Set in an undetermined future past, it reveals the story of a lone traveler who searches for a lost treasure in a parallel world called Sunset/Sunrise. The portal to this world is on 419 East 6th Street in Manhattan.

The narrative first appeared in paintings, followed by performance and the early net art website Love Letters from a World of Awe in 1995. Since then, the project has expanded into other media including sculpture, installation, and Text works. The culture of digital media and technology of the 80's and 90's are critical to the narrative. It functions as both a visual and literary devoice that forms the identity of the traveler.

Awards
Kanarek has been recognized in the United States and abroad with awards including the Rockefeller 2005 New Media Fellowship, 2003 Netizens Webprize, and CNRS/UNESCO Lewis Carroll Argos prize in France, and World Technology Network (WTN) 2014. She has received grants from the Jerome Foundation Media Arts, New York Foundation for the Arts, and commissions from San Francisco Museum of Modern Art, Turbulence.org, and the Alternative Museum. Kanarek has also completed artist residencies at Eyebeam, Harvestworks, Civitella Ranieri, and the Mamuta Art and Media Center.

Education
She earned a Master of Fine Arts in 2007 from Rensselaer Polytechnic Institute and a Bachelor of Fine Arts from Empire State College in 1993. Kanarek teaches new media art at Pratt Institute.

References

External links
Artist's website
World of Awe internet artwork, 1995-ongoing
https://www.beittoratah.org/
http://huc.edu/news/2020/01/16/yael-kanarek-regendered-bible
Portal internet artwork, 2014, for Rhizome Artbase
Podcast interview with Phillip Blackburn  on "Bit by Bit, Cell by Cell"
Podcast of Yael Kanarek's lecture for New Media Scotland at the inaugural Upgrade! Scotland meeting
Artist's jewelry website

American digital artists
Artists from New York (state)
Rensselaer Polytechnic Institute alumni
1967 births
Living people
Electronic literature writers